Jefferson Academy Charter School or JA is a K-12 charter school in unincorporated Jefferson County, Colorado, United States. The K-6 campus is located at 9955 Yarrow Street, Broomfield, Colorado 80021 and the 7–12 campus is located at 11251 Reed Way Broomfield, Colorado 80020.

History
Jefferson Academy was founded in 1994.

In February 2013, Jefferson Academy opened a brand new $9.6 million facility for the junior high and high school students.

References

External links

 Official website

1994 establishments in Colorado
Charter schools in Colorado
Educational institutions established in 1994
Jefferson County Public Schools (Colorado)
Public elementary schools in Colorado
Public high schools in Colorado
Public middle schools in Colorado
Schools in Jefferson County, Colorado